Henri "Rik "Van Steenbergen (9 September 1924 – 15 May 2003) was a Belgian racing cyclist, considered to be one of the best among the great number of successful Belgian cyclists.

Early life
Van Steenbergen was born in Arendonk into a poor family. As a fledgling teenager, he worked successively as cigar-roller in a factory, as errand boy and as bicycle mechanic. Dreaming of a cycling career like that of his idol Karel Kaers, the tall youngster started his first street race in Morkhoven on April 4, 1939, and won it. He eventually became one of Belgium's best juniors from 1939 to 1942, winning 52 road races.

Career
Van Steenbergen was considered a "medical marvel" due to the exceptional large heart he had. 

He started cycling as a professional during World War II in 1942, after being an amateur since he was 14. Although the official age limit was 21, it was decided that he could enter the professional circuit directly at the age of 18. The next year, he won his first important races, and became Belgian road cycling champion. In 1944, he won the Tour of Flanders classic, which he won again two years later.

During his career, which lasted until 1966, Van Steenbergen won several more classics: Paris–Roubaix, Paris–Brussels and Milan–San Remo. He also won the World Road Cycling Championships three times (1949 Copenhagen, 1956 Copenhagen and 1957 Waregem), equalling the (still standing) record of Alfredo Binda. His last world title, a year after his second, was won in front of a home crowd. In addition, he placed third in the first post-war world championships in 1946. He held the Ruban Jaune for seven years for winning the 1948 Paris-Roubaix in a record average speed for a professional race, covering the 246 km at an average of 43.612 km per hour.

His sporting achievements, combined with his physical appearance and natural authority made him a rider who was looked up to in the peloton, with or without fear. It earned him nicknames like The Boss or El Rey (the king).

Van Steenbergen also excelled on the track. He won 40 Six-day events, 276 Omniums and improved two world records. His track capabilities made him an excellent road sprinter. However, due to his size, he usually had difficulty climbing, which prevented him from winning major stage races. He nevertheless placed 2nd in the 1951 Giro d'Italia. 
Between 1949 and 1957 he won four stages in the Tour de France and wore the yellow jersey for two days. In the same period he won fifteen stages in the Giro d'Italia and rode in the leader's pink jersey for nine days. In the Vuelta a España, he achieved six stage victories and the points classification and wore the amarillo jersey for one day. In 1951 he won the Tour of the West in France. The following year he won the Tour of Argentina. It is widely believed that he could have competed for victory in Grand Tours and other stage races had he concentrated on them, instead of racing almost every race he could enter.

After his career, a newspaper calculated that Van Steenbergen rode more than 1 million kilometers on a bike, the equivalent of 25 tours around the world.

Remarkable is a 48-hour spell in 1957, when Van Steenbergen raced in the Belgian Congo, Copenhagen, Paris and Liège, winning all four events.

In total, he won no less than 1,645 races, of which 331 road races and 1,314 track races.

Riding style
The muscular Van Steenbergen was known for his sprints and final jumps at finishes.

Van Steenbergen did not allow himself to be forced into a straitjacket. Nor did he want to surround himself too much with helpers. That gave him too much responsibility to have to win.

He preferred to go his own way, like a free bird in the peloton. On the road, he single-handedly arranged what needed to be done. That usually depended on his fitness, because Van Steenbergen never knew whether he was going to ride well or not, it only became apparent in the race. In that respect, he thrived on impulses.

Motivation 
His big drive was his addiction to cycling. Van Steenbergen really enjoyed the atmosphere and competition in races and was noticed whistling on his bicycle on several occasions.

Another important aspect was the money that could be earned. His background as the child of a poor family, combined with the situation in post-war Belgium undoubtedly contributed to this.
After Van Steenbergen won a classic, he rode numerous other races. And only when the starting money started to decrease, he began aiming on another classic.

From 1960, he also focused more on track cycling. The bigger contracts in this sport and the stifling rivalry with Rik Van Looy were the main drivers of that conscious choice.

At the time he stopped cycling, Van Steenbergen owned several properties and flats in Belgium and Sardinia.

Retirement

At the age of 42, Van Steenbergen ended his career in a packed Brussels Sports Palace. 

Unprepaired for the life without cycling, he entered a dark period afterwards. 

"It wasn't easy to get into mainstream society when they've been kissing your shoes for twenty years." Van Steenbergen later said.

He was named in connection with many unsavory practices. He had a gambling addiction and was suspected of drug trafficking, conspiracy and incitement to debauchery.
During this period, in 1968, he also starred in the Belgian adult movie Pandore as the character Dimitri. In the context of that era the film was a sensational, provocative, scandal movie, although nowadays it wouldn't be labeled as an adult movie at all.

Van Steenbergen also ended up in jail for a while. He came close to prison for smuggling a suspect package over the Dutch border. But his marriage with the British Doreen Hewitt saved him from ruin and he got his life back on track. 

Despite the many side issues, he maintained his popularity among the cycling public. Later in life he became a welcome guest at sports evenings, competitions and television debates.

Death and commemoration
Rik Van Steenbergen died in Antwerp after a prolonged sickness, at the age of 78. The funeral was in the Sint Pauluskerk of Westmalle, attended by about 2000 people, including Eddy Merckx, Rik Van Looy, Roger De Vlaeminck, Walter Godefroot, Johan De Muynck, Lucien Van Impe, Freddy Maertens and Briek Schotte. The UCI president Hein Verbruggen and Belgian prime minister Guy Verhofstadt also attended.

The following year, a statue was erected in his honour on the Wampenberg in Arendonk.

Career achievements

Highlights 
 3 World Road Cycling Championships (1949, 1956, 1957)
 8 major classics wins (Tour of Flanders x 2, Paris–Roubaix x 2, La Flèche Wallonne x 2, Paris–Brussels, Milan–San Remo)
 7 Belgian Road Championships
 4 Stage wins in the Tour de France
 15 Stage wins in the Giro d'Italia (including second overall 1951)
 6 Stage wins in the Vuelta a España
 6 European Track Championships
 40 Six Day wins
 11 Belgian Track Championships

Records 
 Record of most successful World Cycling Champion (3x gold, 1x bronze), shared with Alfredo Binda & Óscar Freire
 Most Critérium des As wins: 5 in 1948, 1952, 1955, 1957 & 1958
 Most Acht van Chaam wins: 3 in 1956, 1958, 1960 (shared record)
 Most Six Days of Brussels wins: 8 in 1948, 1949, 1951, 1955, 1956, 1958, 1960, 1962
 Most Six Days of Madrid wins: 3 in 1963, 1964, 1965
 Most track races won: 1,314 between 1939 and 1966

Major results

Road 

1942
1st  National Road Championships - Interclubs road race
1st in 3 stages of Omloop van Vlaanderen
1943
 National Road Championships
1st  Road race
1st  Interclubs road race
 1st  Championship of Flanders
1944
 1st Tour of Flanders
 1st Omloop der Vlaamse Gewesten
1945
1st   National Road Championships - Road race
1st Dwars door België
1st Halle–Ingooigem
1946
3rd  UCI Road World Championships Road race
 1st Tour of Flanders
 1st :fr:Tour des Quatre-Cantons
1947
Tour de Luxembourg
1st Stage 4
 1st GP de Soignies
1948
 1st Paris–Roubaix
 1st Omloop der drie Provinciën
 1st Critérium des As
1949
1st  UCI Road World Championships, Road race
 Tour de France
1st Stages 12 & 21
 1st La Flèche Wallonne
 1st Tour of Limburg
1950
 1st Paris–Brussels
 1st Grand Prix d'Europe
1951
 2nd Overall Giro d'Italia
1st Stages 1 & 15
Held  after Stages 1, 7, & 13–17 
1st Overall Tour de l'Ouest
1st Stage 2, 4 and 7
 1st Grand Prix d'Europe
 1st Niel-St Truiden
 2nd Critérium des As
3rd Paris–Roubaix
1952
 Giro d'Italia
1st Stages 6, 9 & 10
 Tour de France
1st Stage 1 
Held  after Stages 1–2
 1st Paris–Roubaix
1st Overall Vuelta a la Argentina
1st Stages 1, 8, 12 & 13
 Roma–Napoli–Roma
1st Stage 4
 1st Critérium des As
1st Boucles de l'Aulne
1st Stage 4 Roma–Napoli–Roma
1953
 Giro d'Italia
1st Stage 9
1954
1st  National Road Championships - Road race
 Giro d'Italia
1st Stages 5, 16, 17 & 22
 1st Milan–San Remo
 3rd Roma–Napoli–Roma
1955
 Tour de France
1st Stage 16
 1st Critérium des As
 1st Stage 1b (TTT) Driedaagse van Antwerpen
1st Omloop van Limburg
 3rd Tour of Flanders
1956
 1st  UCI Road World Championships, Road race
 5th Overall  Vuelta a España
1st Stages 1, 7, 8, 11, 14 & 17
1st  Points classification
Tour de l'Ouest
1st Stage 8
1st Omloop van Limburg
 1st Acht van Chaam
 2nd Critérium des As
 3rd Paris-Brussels
1957
 1st  UCI Road World Championships, Road race 
 Giro d'Italia
1st Stages 1, 11, 17b, 20 & 21
 Roma–Napoli–Roma
1st Stages 1b and 5b
 1st Critérium des As
1st Stage 3 Driedaagse van Antwerpen
 2nd Paris-Roubaix
1958
 1st La Flèche Wallonne
 Tour of the Netherlands
Winner Stage 4a
 1st Acht van Chaam
 1st Critérium des As
 1st Overall GP Bali
1959
1st  National Road Championships - Interclubs road race 
Tour de l'Ouest
1st Stage 3
1st Flèche Halloise
2nd Milan-San Remo
1960
 1st Acht van Chaam
 2nd Critérium des As
1961
1st  National Road Championships - Interclubs team time trial
 1st Elfstedenronde
 2nd Tour d'Hesbaye
 2nd Critérium des As
1962
1st  National Road Championships - Interclubs team time trial

Track 

1942
1st  National Track Championships juniors – Men's sprint
1943
2nd  National Track Championship – Omnium
1944
National Track Championship
1st  Omnium
1st  Men's individual pursuit
1945
2nd  National Track Championships – Men's individual pursuit
1946
1st Prix Hourlier-Comès (with Marcel Kint)
1947
2nd Six Days of Ghent (with Robert Naeye)
1948
1st Six Days of Brussels (with Marcel Kint)
3rd  National Track Championships – Men's individual pursuit
3rd Six Days of Antwerp (with Stan Ockers)
1949
1st Six Days of Brussels (with Marcel Kint)
2nd Six Days of Ghent (with Marcel Kint)
3rd Six Days of Paris (with Marcel Kint)
1950
1st Six Days of Antwerp (with Achiel Bruneel)
2nd Six Days of Ghent (with Robert Naeye)
1951
1st Six Days of Brussels (with Stan Ockers)
2nd Six Days of Ghent (with Achiel Bruneel)
3rd Six Days of Paris (with Raymond Goussot)
1952
1st Six Days of Paris (with Raymond Goussot)
2nd Six Days of Antwerp (with Achiel Bruneel)
3rd Six Days of Dortmund (with Gustav Killian)
1953
2nd Six Days of Paris (with Achiel Bruneel)
3rd Six Days of Brussels (with Stan Ockers)
1954
1st Six Days of Ghent (with Stan Ockers)
2nd Six Days of Berlin (with Stan Ockers)
2nd Six Days of Brussels (with Stan Ockers)
3rd Six Days of Antwerp (with Stan Ockers)
1955
National Track Championships
1st  Omnium
1st  Madison
1st Six Days of Antwerp (with Stan Ockers)
1st Six Days of Brussels (with Emile Severeyns)
1st Six Days of Ghent (with Emile Severeyns)
2nd  National Track Championships – Men's sprint
3rd Six Days of Ghent (with Stan Ockers)
3rd Six Days of Berlin (with Sydney Patterson)
1956
1st Six Days of Brussels (with Emile Severeyns)
1st Six Days of Dortmund (with Emile Severeyns)
2nd Six Days of Ghent (with Emile Severeyns)
2nd Six Days of Antwerp (with Emile Severeyns and Arsène Rijckaert)
1957
1st Six Days of Berlin (with Emile Severeyns)
1st Six Days of Ghent (with Fred De Bruyne)
2nd Six Days of Dortmund (with Emile Severeyns)
2nd Six Days of Zürich (with Emile Severeyns)
3rd  European Track Championships – Omnium
3rd Six Days of Antwerp (with Emile Severeyns and Willy Vannitsen)
3rd Six Days of Brussels (with Emile Severeyns)
1958
1st  European Track Championships – Madison (with Emile Severeyns)
1st Six Days of Antwerp (with Emile Severeyns and Reginald Arnold)
1st Six Days of Brussels (with Emile Severeyns)
1st Six Days of Copenhagen (with Emile Severeyns)
1st Six Days of Frankfurt (with Emile Severeyns)
1st Prix Hourlier-Comès (with Emile Severeyns)
2nd  National Track Championships – Men's sprint
2nd Six Days of Berlin (with Emile Severeyns)
2nd Six Days of Ghent (with Emile Severeyns)
2nd Six Days of Zürich (with Emile Severeyns)
1959
European Track Championships
1st  Madison (with Emile Severeyns)
1st  Omnium
1st Six Days of Dortmund (with Klaus Bugdahl)
1st Six Days of Ghent (with Fred De Bruyne)
1st Six Days of Zürich (with Emile Severeyns)
2nd Six Days of Brussels (with Emile Severeyns)
2nd Six Days of Berlin (with Emile Severeyns)
2nd Six Days of Copenhagen (with Emile Severeyns)
2nd Six Days of Frankfurt (with Emile Severeyns)
3rd Six Days of Antwerp (with Emile Severeyns)
3rd Six Days of Cologne (with Heinz Vöpel)
1960
European Track Championships
1st  Madison (with Emile Severeyns)
1st  Omnium
1st Six Days of Aarhus (with Emile Severeyns)
1st Six Days of Brussels (with Emile Severeyns)
1st Six Days of Copenhagen (with Emile Severeyns)
2nd Six Days of Ghent (with Emile Severeyns)
2nd Six Days of Cologne (with Günther Ziegler)
2nd Six Days of Antwerp (with Emile Severeyns and Leo Proost)
1961
European Track Championships
1st  Madison (with Emile Severeyns)
3rd  Omnium
National Track Championships
1st  Omnium
1st  Madison (with Emile Severeyns)
1st  Derny
1st Six Days of Dortmund (with Emile Severeyns)
1st Six Days of Zürich (with Emile Severeyns)
1st Six Days of Berlin (with Klaus Bugdahl)
2nd Six Days of Cologne (with Emile Severeyns)
2nd Six Days of Brussels (with Emile Severeyns)
2nd Six Days of Antwerp (with Emile Severeyns and Gilbert Maes)
2nd Six Days of Ghent (with Emile Severeyns)
3rd Six Days of Aarhus (with Emile Severeyns)
3rd Six Days of Frankfurt (with Emile Severeyns)
3rd Six Days of Berlin (with Emile Severeyns)
1962
European Track Championships
2nd  Omnium
3rd  Madison (with Emile Severeyns)
1st  National Track Championships – Derny
1st Six Days of Brussels (with Palle Lykke)
1st Six Days of Madrid (with Emile Severeyns)
1st Six Days of Cologne (with Emile Severeyns)
2nd Six Days of Antwerp (with Emile Severeyns and Palle Lykke)
2nd Six Days of Münster (with Emile Severeyns)
2nd Six Days of Berlin-a (with Emile Severeyns)
2nd Six Days of Berlin-b (with Emile Severeyns)
2nd Six Days of Essen (with Emile Severeyns)
1963
European Track Championships
1st  Madison (with Palle Lykke)
2nd  Derny
3rd  Omnium
National Track Championships
1st  Omnium
1st  Derny
1st Six Days of Antwerp (with Palle Lykke) and Leo Proost)
1st Six Days of Frankfurt (with Palle Lykke)
1st Six Days of Madrid (with Joseph De Bakker)
2nd Six Days of Essen (with Peter Post)
2nd Six Days of Berlin (with Rik Van Looy)
2nd Six Days of Brussels (with Palle Lykke)
3rd Six Days of Cologne (with Palle Lykke)
3rd Six Days of Dortmund (with Palle Lykke)
3rd Six Days of Milan (with Emile Severeyns)
3rd Six Days of Zürich (with Rik Van Looy))
1964
National Track Championships
1st  Derny
European Track Championships
2nd  Derny
1st Six Days of Milan (with Leandro Faggin)
1st Six Days of Madrid (with Federico Bahamontes)
2nd Six Days of Brussels (with Palle Lykke)
2nd Six Days of Cologne (with Palle Lykke)
2nd Six Days of Zürich (with Emile Severeyns)
2nd Six Days of Antwerp (with Palle Lykke) and Leo Proost)
3rd Six Days of Essen (with Palle Lykke)
1965
1st Six Days of Bremen (with Leandro Faggin)
1st Six Days of Milan (with Gianni Motta)
1st Six Days of Essen (with Peter Post)
1st Six Days of Toronto (with Emile Severeyns)
1st Six Days of Quebec (with Emile Severeyns)
1st Six Days of Madrid (with Romain De Loof)
European Track Championships
2nd  Madison (with Palle Lykke)
2nd Six Days of Antwerp (with Palle Lykke) and Freddy Eugen)
2nd Six Days of Brussels (with Palle Lykke)
2nd Six Days of Ghent (with Emile Severeyns)
1966
European Track Championships
2nd  Madison (with Palle Lykke)
2nd  Omnium
National Track Championships
2nd  Omnium
2nd Six Days of Cologne (with Peter Post)

Source:

Awards and honours 

  Ruban Jaune: 1948->1955
  Officer in the Belgian Order of Leopold II: 1957
 Millionär auf Zwei Rädern, a German movie about him: 1965
 Swiss AIOCC Trophy: 1967
 Medal of honour of the City of Brussels: 1967
 Bust by the KBWB: 1967
 GP Rik Van Steenbergen: from 1991
 Rik van Steenbergen Classic from 1999
 Province of Antwerp sportsman of the 20th Century: 2000
 Introduced in the UCI Hall of Fame: 2002
 Bust in Arendonk: 2004
 UCI Top 100 of All Time: 4,900 points

Books 

 Rik Van Steenbergen: Het kind der goden by Peter Woeti in 1957. Hidawa, 80 p. (Dutch)
 Rik van Steenbergen by Fred De Bruyne in 1963. G. Kolff, 41 p. (Dutch)
 De Miljoenenfiets van Rik Van Steenbergen by Achille Van Den Broeck in 1966. De Brauwere, 391 p. (Dutch)
 Rik I van Steenbergen by René Vermeiren, Hugo De Meyer in 1999. De Eecloonaar, 272 p.  (Dutch, French, English, Italian, Spanish)
 Rik I Memorial (1924 - 2003) by René Vermeiren in 2003. De Eecloonaar, 56 p.  (Dutch)
 Rik Van Steenbergen. Das Ass der Asse by Walter Rottiers. Bielefeld in 2005, Covadonga-Verlag, 144 p.  (German)

See also
 Memorial Rik Van Steenbergen

References

External links 
Official Tour de France results for Rik Van Steenbergen

1924 births
2003 deaths
Belgian male cyclists
Belgian Tour de France stage winners
UCI Road World Champions (elite men)
Belgian Giro d'Italia stage winners
Belgian Vuelta a España stage winners
Cyclists from Antwerp Province
People from Arendonk